Tone Gravvold (born 19 June 1977) is a Norwegian cross-country skier and biathlete, and since 1998, also a cyclist. She won a dozen medals in the Paralympic Games in which she competed at between 1994 and 2006. In 2019, she was named Sportsperson of the Century for Møre og Romsdal.

For the Oslo Vikings, she has competed in the Norwegian championships in goalball for the visually impaired. She has retinitis pigmentosa and competes in the B1 and B2 classes, has been on the board of the RP association since 2009, and works as a psychologist, in 2015 working for the National Centre for Rheumatological Rehabilitation at the Diakonhjemmet.

Titles

Cross-country skiing 
 1994 Winter Paralympics (Lillehammer):  
 Cross-country skiing: Gold in 5 km freestyle (B2), bronze in 10 km classic (B2)
 Biathlon: 8th in 7.5 freestyle (B1-3).
 1998 Winter Paralympics (Nagano):  Gold in 5 km freestyle (B2-3), bronze in 15 km classic (B1-3), gold in relay 3x2.5 km (open) with Frode Nilssen as lead.
 2002 Paralympic Winter Games (Salt Lake City):  
 Cross-country skiing: Bronze in 5 km classic (B2-3), gold in relay 3x2.5 (open)
 Biathlon: Silver in 7.5 km freestyle (blind)
 Cross-country skiing at the 2006 Winter Paralympics (Torino): 11th in 10 km and 10th in 15 km (blind and visually impaired in the same class). Led by Fredrik Thomassen.

Cycling 
 2000 Paralympic Games (Sydney):  Nr. 9 in 1000 m track (1.11.806), nr. 10 in duotempo, nr. 6 in sprint (11,861).  Per Olve Tobiassen was pilot.
 2004 Paralympic Games (Athens):  (B1-3): 
 Road: Nr. 2 in tandem tempo, nr. 5 in tandem joint start and nr. 4 combined. With Ingunn Bollerud pilot.
 Track cycling: Nr. 4 in 3000 m (3.46.581) and nr. 5 in 1000 m (1.13.507).  With May Britt Hartwell as pilot.
 European cycling championships:
 2005 (Alkmaar, Netherlands):  Gold in tempotandem and bronze in joint start tandem with Ingunn Bollerud as pilot
 Birken:  Record for tandem cycle 3.13 (2000). Pilot Per Olve Tobiassen. 4 career medal with the same pilot.
 NM: 2000 Norwegian Champion road tandem. Pilot Per Olve Tobiassen

Honours 
 Erling Stordahls ærespris 2004
Sportsperson of the Century Møre og Romsdal, 2019.

References

External links 
 

Living people
1977 births
Paralympic cross-country skiers of Norway
Paralympic cyclists of Norway
Paralympic biathletes of Norway
Cross-country skiers at the 1994 Winter Paralympics
Cross-country skiers at the 1998 Winter Paralympics
Cross-country skiers at the 2002 Winter Paralympics
Cyclists at the 2000 Summer Paralympics
Cyclists at the 2004 Summer Paralympics
Norwegian psychologists
Norwegian female cyclists
Norwegian female cross-country skiers
Norwegian female biathletes
Norwegian disabled sportspeople
Paralympic gold medalists for Norway
Paralympic silver medalists for Norway
Paralympic bronze medalists for Norway
Medalists at the 1994 Winter Paralympics
Medalists at the 1998 Winter Paralympics
Medalists at the 2002 Winter Paralympics
People from Surnadal
Scientists with disabilities